Rockland District High School (other common names are RDHS and RD) is a public intermediate and secondary school in Clarence-Rockland, Ontario, Canada. It is part of the Upper Canada District School Board. The school has offered secondary grades 9-12 since opening, and added intermediate grades 7–8 in the 2012–2013 school year. Two new classrooms were built in the summer of 2012 on the second floor to accommodate the additional grades. The student population is 405 .

See also
 List of high schools in Ontario

References

External links
 

High schools in Ontario
Educational institutions in Canada with year of establishment missing